Dino Joseph Chiozza (June 30, 1912 – April 23, 1972) was a Major League Baseball shortstop who played for one season. He played for the Philadelphia Phillies in two games during the 1935 Philadelphia Phillies season, appearing as a late-inning pinch runner and/or defensive replacement on both occasions.  In both games, he appeared at shortstop, while his brother Lou Chiozza played second base.  He never had a plate appearance, although in his second and final game, he was on deck in the 10th inning when George Watkins flied out to end the inning.  The Phillies, playing on the road, then lost the game in the bottom of the 10th.

External links

1912 births
1972 deaths
Philadelphia Phillies players
Major League Baseball shortstops
Baseball players from Tennessee
American people of Italian descent